John Harrison VC (24 January 1832 – 27 December 1865) was an Irish recipient of the Victoria Cross, the highest award for gallantry in the face of the enemy that can be awarded to British and Commonwealth forces.

Early life
Harrison was born in Castleboro, County Wexford; he joined the Royal Navy as a Boy Second Class in 1850.

Details
Harrison was 25 years old, and a Leading Seaman in the Royal Navy, (Naval Brigade) from HMS Shannon during the Indian Mutiny when the following deed took place on 16 November 1857 at Lucknow, India for which he and Nowell Salmon were awarded the VC:

Later life
Harrison later achieved the rank of Boatswain's Mate in 1858 and left the navy in 1859. He obtained a post in Customs and Excise but a wound sustained during the relief of Lucknow affected his health. He died unmarried at his home 5 Stafford Place, Westminster on 27 December 1865 and is buried at Brompton Cemetery, West London.

The medal
Harrison's Victoria Cross is displayed at the National Maritime Museum in Greenwich, London.

References

Listed in order of publication year 
The Register of the Victoria Cross (1981, 1988 and 1997)

Ireland's VCs  (Dept of Economic Development, 1995)
Monuments to Courage (David Harvey, 1999)
Irish Winners of the Victoria Cross (Richard Doherty & David Truesdale, 2000)

External links
Location of grave and VC medal (Brompton Cemetery)

People from County Wexford
Royal Navy sailors
Irish recipients of the Victoria Cross
1832 births
1865 deaths
19th-century Irish people
Burials at Brompton Cemetery
Indian Rebellion of 1857 recipients of the Victoria Cross
Royal Navy recipients of the Victoria Cross
Royal Navy personnel of the Crimean War
Royal Navy personnel of the Second Opium War